Apterobittacus is a genus of hangingflies in the family Bittacidae. There is one described species in Apterobittacus, A. apterus.

References

Further reading

 
 
 

Hangingflies
Insects described in 1893
Articles created by Qbugbot